The black-vented shearwater (Puffinus opisthomelas) is a species of seabird.  The bird is 30–38 cm in length with a 76–89 cm wingspan. Formerly considered a subspecies of the Manx shearwater, its actual taxonomic relationships are unresolved.

This species is pelagic, occurring in the Pacific Ocean and the Gulf of California. It comes closer to land than most other shearwaters, so it can sometimes be seen from shore. It nests predominantly on offshore islands off north and western Baja California, namely Isla Natividad (ca. 95% of the nesting population), Isla de Guadalupe, and Islas San Benito. It is fairly common off the United States coast of central and southern California during the country's colder months.

The black-vented shearwater is thought to feed on mainly small fish. This bird nests in burrows and caves; it is a colonial nester.

In the past, this bird had been threatened by feral cats and other predators on its breeding islands, but the problem seems to have been largely eliminated. There is some loss of birds from commercial gill netting, and the species is classified as near threatened by the IUCN mainly due to the uncertain impact on it by the expanding fishing industry.

References

Further reading
 Carboneras, Carles (1992): 65. Black-vented Shearwater. In: del Hoyo, Josep; Elliott, Andrew & Sargatal, Jordi (eds.): Handbook of Birds of the World (Volume 1: Ostrich to Ducks): 255–256, Plate 16. Lynx Edicions, Barcelona. 
 Harrison, Peter (1983): Seabirds: An Identification Guide. Croom Helm, Beckenham. 
 National Geographic Society (2002): Field Guide to the Birds of North America. National Geographic, Washington DC.

External links
 Black-vented shearwater photos
Black-vented shearwater photo gallery – VIREO
Photo-High Res – southwestbirders

black-vented shearwater
Western North American coastal fauna
Birds of Mexico
Native birds of the West Coast of the United States
Endemic birds of Southwestern North America
black-vented shearwater
black-vented shearwater